Charles Harold Lilley (3 July 1892 – 16 June 1982) was an Australian rules footballer who played with Melbourne in the Victorian Football League (VFL).

Family
The son of Charles William Henry Lilley (1893-1918), and Mary Louisa Lilley (1866-1956), née Wright, Charles Harold Lilley was born at Armadale, Victoria on 3 July 1892.

Football

In May 1919, an unidentified former Melbourne footballer, wrote to the football correspondent of The Argus as follows:
"In 1914 the Melbourne football team, after its junction with the University, was a fine team, and succeeded in reaching the semi-finals.Out of this combination the following players enlisted and served at the front:—C. Lilley (seriously wounded), J. Hassett, H. Tomkins (severely wounded), J. Evans (seriously wounded), W. Hendrie, R. L. Park, J. Doubleday (died), A. Best, C. Burge (killed), C. (viz., A.) Williamson (killed), J. Brake, R. Lowell, E. Parsons (seriously wounded), A. M. Pearce (killed), F. Lugton (killed), A. George, C. Armstrong, P. Rodriguez (killed), J. Cannole (viz., Connole), A. Fraser (seriously wounded), T. Collins.These are all players of note, and in themselves would have formed a very fine side, but there is only one of them playing at the present time, viz., C. Lilley, who, as a matter of fact, takes the field under some disability owing to severe wounds which he received on service." — The Argus, 16 May 1919.

Military service
He served in the First AIF during World War One.

He played for the (winning) Third Australian Divisional team in the famous "Pioneer Exhibition Game" of Australian Rules football, held in London, in October 1916. A news film was taken at the match.

See also
 1916 Pioneer Exhibition Game

Notes

References
 Pioneer Exhibition Game Australian Football: in aid of British and French Red Cross Societies: 3rd Australian Division v. Australian Training Units at Queen's Club, West Kensington, on Saturday, October 28th, 1916, at 3pm, Wightman & Co., (London), 1919.
 Richardson, N. (2016), The Game of Their Lives, Pan Macmillan Australia: Sydney. 
 Photograph at An All-Round Sport, The Winner, (Wednesday, 29 November 1916), p.8.
 First World War Embarkation Roll: Gunner Charles Harold Lilley (19632), collection of the Australian War Memorial.
 First World War Nominal Roll: Bombardier Charles Harold Lilley (19632), collection of the Australian War Memorial.
 Bombardier Charles Harold Lilley (19632), National Archives of Australia.
 Holmesby, Russell & Main, Jim (2014), The Encyclopedia of AFL Footballers: every AFL/VFL player since 1897 (10th ed.), Seaford, Victoria: BAS Publishing.

External links 

 
 
 Charlie Lilley, at Demonwiki.

1892 births
1982 deaths
Australian rules footballers from Melbourne
Melbourne Football Club players
Participants in "Pioneer Exhibition Game" (London, 28 October 1916)
People from Armadale, Victoria